Birds described in 1877 include the giant ibis, black-and-yellow phainoptila, Cebu flowerpecker, Drakensberg prinia, Finsch's euphonia, lava heron, Manus friarbird, Palawan tit, plain-backed antpitta, rufous-fronted tailorbird and Walden's hornbill.

Events
Death of Matteo Botteri
Death of Robert Swinhoe
James Edmund Fotheringham Harting becomes editor of The Zoologist (until 1896)

Publications
Jean-Frédéric Émile Oustalet  with Armand David, Les Oiseaux de la Chine, (The Birds of China, two volumes).
Richard Bowdler Sharpe Catalogue of the Passeriformes, or perching birds, in the collection of the British Museum. Coliomorphae... (1877).
Arthur, Marquis of Tweeddale 1877. Reports on the collections of birds made during the voyage of H.M.S. Challenger - No. II. On the birds of the Philippine Islands. Proceedings of the Zoological Society of London  1877 (III): 535–551.
José Vicente Barbosa du Bocage Ornithologie d'Angola. 2 volumes, 1877–1881.
Gustav Hartlaub 1877. Die Vögel Madagascars und der benachbarten Inselgruppen. Ein Beitrag zur Zoologie der äthiopischen Region.Halle :H.W. Schmidt,1877. online BHL
Jean Cabanis and other members of the German Ornithologists' Society in Ornithologisches Centralblatt Leipzig :L.A. Kittler,1876-82. online
John Gould; The Birds of New Guinea and the Adjacent Papuan Islands, including many new species recently discovered in Australia; 1875–88. 5 vols. 300 plates; Parts 13–25 completed after Gould's death by R. Bowdler Sharpe; Artists: J. Gould and W. Hart; Lithographer: W. Hart

Ongoing events
John Gould The Birds of Asia 1850-83 7 vols. 530 plates, Artists: J. Gould, H. C. Richter, W. Hart and J. Wolf; Lithographers: H. C. Richter and W. Hart
Henry Eeles Dresser and Richard Bowdler Sharpe  A History of the Birds of Europe, Including all the Species Inhabiting the Western Palearctic Region. Taylor & Francis of Fleet Street, London
Etienne Mulsant, Histoire Naturelle des Oiseaux-Mouches, ou Colibris constituant la famille des Trochilides (published 1874–77)
The Ibis

References

Bird
Birding and ornithology by year